Jack's Back is a 1988 crime thriller horror film written and directed by Rowdy Herrington and starring James Spader and Cynthia Gibb.

Plot
A young doctor in Los Angeles named John Wesford becomes a suspect when a series of Jack the Ripper copycat killings is committed. He and another young doctor (Jack Pendler) are at the scene of the final crime in the series; they know each other because they both work for the same medical unit, reporting to the abusive Dr. Sidney Tannerson. Pendler seems to realize that John Wesford's testimony will likely lead to his being arrested as the killer, and in an ambiguously staged scene, murders him, staging the scene to resemble a suicide. The police quickly name John Wesford as the copycat killer and hypothesize that he killed himself out of guilt.

To the surprise of everybody involved, John Wesford's identical twin brother, Rick, arrives and claims to know his brother did not kill himself because he has seen visions of the true killer. In flashbacks, the viewer sees that Rick Wesford saw Jack Pendler killing his brother. The police humor Rick briefly, but only because his existence calls into question the eyewitness testimony that had put the identical-looking John at the scene of the crime, and Rick's suspicious knowledge of the crime scene (from his visions) make him an attractive suspect himself. Under scrutiny by the police, Rick allies himself with another of his brother's colleagues, Dr. Chris Moscari, and carries out his own investigation. He successfully identifies, tracks down, and confronts Pendler, who attacks him and is arrested. Pendler is in some regards an excellent suspect — physical evidence puts him at the scene of the final murder. But in other regards he is a terrible one, not matching known characteristics or habits of the killer.

Rick continues to dream about his brother's murder and asks the police psychologist to hypnotize him to clarify these visions. In the refined vision he again sees Pendler attack his brother, but also notices that Pendler's shoes do not match those worn by the copycat killer, and that Dr. Tannerson had been at the scene. He intuits that Tannerson will next attack Dr. Moscari and speeds to her house, attracting a string of police cars with his reckless driving. Moscari survives and Rick avenges his brother's death by killing Tannerson, who (it is implied) had manipulated Pendler into murdering the unfortunate twin.

Cast and characters
 James Spader as John/Rick Wesford 
 Cynthia Gibb as Chris Moscari
 Jim Haynie as Sgt. Gabriel
 Robert Picardo as Dr. Carlos Battera
 Rod Loomis as Dr. Sidney Tannerson
 Rex Ryon as Jack Pendler
 Chris Mulkey as Scott Morofsky
 Mario Machado as Anchorman
 Danitza Kingsley as Denise Johnson
 John Wesley as Sam Hilliard
 Bobby Hosea as Tom Dellerton
 Diane Erickson as Andrea Banks
 Wendell Wright as Det. Walter Prentis

Reception
The film got a negative review in The New York Times, which read in part "Jack's Back, which opens today at the Cine 1 and other theaters, is so dull it leaves you plenty of time to marvel at how a plot can be this rickety, how a production can look this shabby, and how the first-time writer and director Rowdy Herrington could borrow a story with so relentless a grip on our imaginations and in no time at all declaw it."

Conversely, both Gene Siskel & Roger Ebert gave it a thumbs up with Siskel declaring that it was a most impressive debut for Rowdy Herrington, as it was for Spader and Gibb. Jack's Back has a 71% rating on Rotten Tomatoes based on reviews from 7 critics.

Home media
UK-based distributor Slam Dunk Media released the film on DVD in May 2007 in 1.33:1 full frame format. It is the only DVD release to date in that area. It was available on Netflix video streaming service in SD widescreen format. Scream Factory released the film in fall 2015 for the first time on Blu-ray Disc in the US, and also included a DVD in the package knowing that the film had never made it to the format in North America.

Soundtrack and film's title 
Originally the director wanted to call the film Red Rain and have the song of the same name by Peter Gabriel playing as the opening credits theme. However the budget didn't allow for licensing the song, and so instead Paul Saax was brought on board to co-write a new theme "Red Harvest". The movie name was changed to Jack's Back as a result.

References

External links
 
 
 

1988 films
1988 directorial debut films
1988 horror films
1988 independent films
1980s English-language films
1980s slasher films
1988 thriller films
American horror thriller films
American independent films
American mystery films
American serial killer films
American slasher films
Films about Jack the Ripper
Films about twin brothers
Films directed by Rowdy Herrington
Films set in Los Angeles
Films shot in Los Angeles
1980s American films